The 2010 Erie Storm season was the 4th season for the American Indoor Football Association franchise.

On September 8, 2009 the RiverRats announced that Liotta would return to Erie as the head coach for the 2010 season. In December, it was announced that owner Jeff Hauser had sold a stake in the franchise to a local group that included Jeff Plyler (owner of Plyler Overhead Door of McKean, PA) and Bill Stafford (owner of several Subway restaurant locations in Erie), among others. The team remained in the AIFA, and the team adopted the corporate name "Erie Professional Football, Inc." in December 2009, in anticipation of a new franchise name to be announced in January 2010.

Hauser maintained a smaller stake in the team, which immediately dropped the RiverRats name. On January 5, 2010, the team announced the four finalists of the name-the-team contest; Storm, Blizzard, Pulse, and Punishers. On January 14, 2010 the team was officially named the Erie Storm via a press conference, in which the team logo and colors were also released.

Aided by Dinkins's return, the briefly rechristened Storm rebounded to an 8-6 season in 2010, before losing to the Harrisburg Stampede in the playoffs. Dinkins retired at the end of the season.

On May 5, 2010, Lake Erie College based in Painesville, Ohio asked a court judge to order the Erie Storm not use the Erie Storm name due to similarities with their own name the Lake Erie College whose athletic nickname is the Storm. In July 2010, the name "Storm" was dropped, and the team began functioning under the name "Erie Professional Football," which remains the name of the team's corporate entity.

Schedule

Regular season

Standings

 Green indicates clinched playoff berth
 Purple indicates division champion
 Grey indicates best league record

References

Erie Storm
Erie Explosion seasons
2010 in sports in Pennsylvania